Oleksandr Omelchenko Bloc is a local political party in the capital of Ukraine, Kyiv led by former mayor of Kyiv Oleksandr Omelchenko. During the 2008 local election the party won 2,26% of the votes and no seats in the Kyiv City Council.

History

Election results

Kyiv City Council

References

Political parties in Kyiv
Political parties established in 2008